is a retired Japanese swimmer and former world record holder who specializes in the breaststroke.

At the 2011 World Junior Swimming Championships in Lima, Yamaguchi won a total of four medals: one gold and three silvers.  His gold came in the 200-meter breaststroke with a time of 2:11.70.

On September 15, 2012, at the National Sports Festival of Japan, he set a new world record in the 200-meter breaststroke (long course) with a time of 2:07.01, bettering the previous record of 2:07.28.

Personal bests

References

External links
 
 

1994 births
Living people
Japanese male breaststroke swimmers
World record setters in swimming
Sportspeople from Kagoshima Prefecture
20th-century Japanese people
21st-century Japanese people